Immortals is a 2018 Turkish web series starring Elçin Sangu, Kerem Bürsin and Birkan Sokullu.

Plot
The plot is set in Istanbul and revolves around the vampire Mia (Elçin Sangu) who wants to kill the vampire who turned her, Dmitry (Kerem Bürsin), so that she will return to being a human again. To be able to do that, Mia first has to gain Dmitry's confidence.

Cast
 Elçin Sangu as Mia
 Kerem Bürsin as Dmitry
 Birkan Sokullu as Numel
 Selma Ergeç as Karmen
 Nilperi Şahinkaya as Melisa
 Efecan Şenolsun as Sercan
 Türkü Turan as Zehra
 Elit İşcan as Ayşe
 Oral Özer as Yavuz
 Hazal Türesan as Yisa
 İpek Tenolcay as Mari
 Edip Tepeli as Sisman
 Erdeniz Kurucan as Turgut
 Birce Kırkova as Beril Acar

Release
Immortals was released between July 17, 2018 and October 18, 2018 on BluTV

References

External links
 
 

Turkish television series
2010s drama television series
Turkish drama television series
Turkish-language television shows
2018 Turkish television series debuts
Turkic mythology in popular culture
Television series about vampires
Television series produced in Istanbul
Television shows set in Istanbul
Television series set in the 2010s
Turkish television series endings
Fantasy television series
2018 Turkish television series endings
2010s supernatural television series